Qareh Now Deh (also Romanized as Qareh Now Deh; also known as Now Deh) is a village in Badranlu Rural District, in the Central District of Bojnord County, North Khorasan Province, Iran. At the 2006 census, its population was 485, in 131 families.

References 

Populated places in Bojnord County